Rachel Rossin (born 1987, West Palm Beach, Florida) is a multi-media and installation artist based in New York City.

Personal life 
When Rossin was 16, her mother brought her to the Whitney Museum of American Art where she was attracted to Kiki Smith’s wax figures. Rossin expressed that the gallery exhibition had a profound impact on her career, saying “I hated them and I loved them because they were both repulsive and tender. These feelings kept competing and rolling over each other for the front of my mind."

Career

Solo Work 
In 2015, Rossin's exhibition, N=7 / The Wake in Heat of Collapse, located at SIGNAL in New York, New York, was a virtual reality simulation that employs the structure of side-scrolling gameplay to create an immersive, Oculus Rift-based experience. Additionally, in 2015, Rossin held her work, Shelter of a Limping Substrate, at the Elliott Levenglick Gallery. Shelter of a Limping Substrate refers to the underlying layer in 3D imaging. She created formal en plein air paintings, which then were reimagined in virtual reality CAD software.

From October 15—November 14, 2015, Rachel held her work, Lossy, at the ZieherSmith, a contemporary art gallery in New York City. In Rossin's words: “The exhibition posits that our relationship with reality isn't  a separate virtual and real but looks more like a gradient between the two— with most of our modern lives being lived in the action of hopping from screen to screen. Like lossy compression, this process includes entropy as an inherent given— in optimizing what already exists by omitting the excess in worlds with their own internal logic.”

From December 9, 2016—January 15, 2017, the exhibition, My Little Green Leaf was held in partnership with Art in General and kim? Contemporary Art Centre in Riga, Latvia. The installation piece interweaves the viewers interactive experience with virtual reality and physical space.

In 2017, she debuted a piece The Sky is a Gap, where she mapped a room-scale virtual reality installation to move 3D time and explosions by the user's movements.

Group work 
From January 19, 2017—March 3, 2017 Rossin participated in ‘The Unframed World’ located at the HeK (House of electronic Arts Basel) in Basel, Switzerland. This group exhibition presented various approaches in using virtual reality as an artistic medium.

From March 17, 2017—May 31, 2017 Rossin is working with other artists at Chi K11 Art Museum in Shanghai, China.

Rossin will be partaking in a group exhibition ‘ARS17’ at Kiasma located in Helsinki, Finland from March 31, 2017—January 14, 2018. This exhibition will stage international artists working under the theme of digital revolution.

In 2018, Rachel Rossin worked with Cecilia Salama on new store display through May at Melissa shoes, a Brazilian rubberized shoe company. Rossin's video piece is played on massive pixelated screens that comprise the Melissa store lobby.

Awards and fellowships 
 Fellowship in Virtual Reality at New Museum's Incubator New Inc (2015-2016)
 Kate Spade & Co Foundation Grant (2015)
 Cultured Magazine '30 under 35' (2016)
 Forbes '30 Under 30' in Art & Style (2017)

References

External links 
 Rachel Rossin - Artforum review (PDF)

1987 births
Living people
American installation artists